Hum is a village in the municipality of Trebinje, Republika Srpska, Bosnia and Herzegovina. Between 1901 and 1976, it used to be an important junction on the Gabela - Zelenika narrow gauge railway.

References

Villages in Republika Srpska
Populated places in Trebinje
Herzegovina